Aemulatrix aequilibra is a moth of the family Tortricidae first described by Alexey Diakonoff in 1982. It is found in Sri Lanka.

References

Enarmoniini
Moths of Asia
Moths described in 1982
Taxa named by Alexey Diakonoff